The following is a list of events affecting Philippine television in 1979. Events listed include television show debuts, finales, cancellations, and channel launches, closures and rebrandings, as well as information about controversies and carriage disputes.

Events
 July 30 – RPN 9 launches Eat Bulaga!.

Premieres

Unknown dates

Unknown
Gulong ng Palad on RPN 9
Chicks to Chicks on IBC 13

Finales

Stopped airing
 August 27: Voltes V

Unknown
 Gulong ng Palad on BBC 2

Births
January 29 – Boom Labrusca,  actor
April 10 – Ryan Agoncillo, film television actor model and photographer
July 20 – Claudine Barretto, actress
August 22 – Angelu de Leon, actress
October 4 – Zen Hernandez, broadcaster
November 6 - Maricar de Mesa, actress
November 26 – Sheryn Regis, singer, songwriter and television host

See also
1979 in television

References

 
Television in the Philippines by year
Philippine television-related lists